Chilly Willy is a 1953 Chilly Willy cartoon, and the first in the Chilly Willy series. Chilly Willy would have a major redesign in his next cartoon, I'm Cold, by cartoon director Tex Avery.

Plot
A schooner anchors at the South Pole, and the skipper goes ashore and leaves the ship's mascot, a St. Bernard, to stand watch and guard the ship. A small penguin, Chilly Willy (the only penguin who is not equipped for cold weather...anywhere), sees the ship and tries to get warm by its stove. The watchdog attempts to get rid of him, but Willy manages to get the dog drunk from the rum in its own cask. The captain returns to find Willy saving the ship from sinking, while the dog is found sleeping it off. Chilly Willy is made mascot and the dog is tossed in the ship's brig.

References

External links

Video

1953 animated films
1953 films
Walter Lantz Productions shorts
Universal Pictures animated short films
Animated films about animals
Animated films about penguins
1950s American animated films
1950s English-language films